Sribne is an urban-type settlement in Pryluky Raion, Chernihiv Oblast (province) of northern Ukraine. It hosts the administration of Sribne settlement hromada, one of the hromadas of Ukraine. Population: 

Until 18 July 2020, Sribne was the administrative center of Sribne Raion. The raion was abolished in July 2020 as part of the administrative reform of Ukraine, which reduced the number of raions of Chernihiv Oblast to five. The area of Sribne Raion was merged into Pryluky Raion.

References

Priluksky Uyezd
Urban-type settlements in Pryluky Raion